The Rumpler C.VIII was a German single-engine biplane advanced trainer manufactured by Rumpler Flugzeugwerke, in Berlin Johannisthal in 1917.

Design and development
The C.VIII variant was developed with the intention of providing an operational trainer for aircrews nearing the end of their training with particular emphasis on the observers' curriculum of gunnery, observation, radio and photography. The aircraft was close to standards applicable to full military operation but could also be operated economically.

Operational history
A strategic need for improved and intensified training in connection with an ultimate offensive on the Western Front in March 1918 existed. To facilitate this higher standard of training, the C.VIII was introduced towards the end of 1917 with the Flieger Ersatz Abteilungen, i.e. Flying Training Units.

Operators

Luftstreitkräfte

 The Finnish Air Force ordered one aircraft in February 1918. It was used by the Finnish White army as a reconnaissance aircraft. The aircraft remained in Finnish Air Force use until 1924.

 The Dutch Air Force ordered 40 aircraft in 1918. The aircraft were traded, for among other, 5000 horses. The aircraft were used only briefly, because of a number of fires in the aircraft.

 Polish Air Force 6 aircraft captured in 1918.

Specifications (C.VIII)

See also

References

Further reading

 

1910s German military trainer aircraft
Biplanes
C.VIII
Single-engined tractor aircraft
Aircraft first flown in 1917